Star Bright is the fourth studio album and first Christmas album by Vanessa Williams, released in the US on November 5, 1996 on Mercury Records. It achieved success as one of the best-selling holiday albums of 1996 and '97. It peaked at #36 on the Billboard 200, #24 on the Top R&B/Hip-Hop Albums and #5 on the Top Holiday Albums. The album went on to be nominated for a 1997 Grammy Award for Best Pop/Contemporary Gospel Album and was certified gold by the RIAA for sales of over 500,000 copies. 

Although no official singles were released from the album, "Do You Hear What I Hear/The Little Drummer Boy" reached #15 on the Hot Adult Contemporary Tracks chart. A video was shot in 1993 for "What Child Is This?" that was originally featured on the A&M Records Christmas compilation A Very Special Christmas 2. The album was re-released in 2003 as The Christmas Collection: 20th Century Masters: The Best of Vanessa Williams.

Track listing
"Do You Hear What I Hear/The Little Drummer Boy" (K. Davis, Henry Onorati, Noel Regeny, Gloria Shayne, Harry Simeone, Traditional) - 5:02
"Star Bright" (Rob Mathes) - 3:37
"Hark! The Herald Angels Sing (Shout)" (Mathes, Felix Mendelssohn, Charles Wesley) - 5:34
"Baby, It's Cold Outside" (With Bobby Caldwell) (Frank Loesser) - 5:51
"I Wonder as I Wander" (Mathes) - 4:40
"Sleep Well, Little Children" (Alan Bergman, Leon Klatzkin) - 0:40
"Angels We Have Heard on High" (Traditional) - 4:58
"The First Noel" (William Sandys) - 4:28
"What Child Is This?" (William Chatterton Dix, Traditional) - 3:52
"Gracious Good Shepherd" (Mathes) - 4:15
"Go Tell It on the Mountain/Mary Had a Baby" (Public domain, Traditional) - 5:48
"I'll Be Home for Christmas" (Kim Gannon, Walter Kent, Buck Ram) - 3:32

Certifications

Mercury Records albums
Vanessa Williams albums
1996 Christmas albums
Christmas albums by American artists
Contemporary R&B Christmas albums